9H or 9-H can refer to:

9H, IATA code for Dutch Antilles Express
9H, see London Buses route 9 (Heritage)
New York State Route 9H
N-9H, a model of Curtiss Model N
WAG-9H, a model of Indian locomotive class WAG-9
9H, National aircraft registration prefix for Malta
The highest pencil hardness grade
9H Maltese AOC

See also
H9 (disambiguation)